John Hedges or Hodges (by 1503 – 12 January 1562), of Malmesbury, Wiltshire, was an English politician.

Family
Hedges married, by 1531, Joan Howell, probably the daughter of John Howell of Somerset. They had at least one son and two daughters. He also had an illegitimate daughter.

Career
He was a Member (MP) of the Parliament of England for Malmesbury in October 1553, April 1554 and November 1554.

References

1562 deaths
Members of the Parliament of England for Malmesbury
English MPs 1553 (Mary I)
English MPs 1554
English MPs 1554–1555
Year of birth uncertain